Epidemas is a genus of moths of the family Noctuidae.

Species
 Epidemas cinerea Smith, 1894
 Epidemas obscurus Smith, 1903 (alternative spelling Epidemas obscura, syn: Epidemas melanographa Hampson, 1906)

References
Natural History Museum Lepidoptera genus database
Lithomoia at funet

Cuculliinae
Noctuoidea genera